Ralph Sultan (born June 6, 1933) is a Canadian politician, who was the Member of the Legislative Assembly (MLA) for the community of West Vancouver-Capilano in British Columbia from 2001 to 2020.

A member of the British Columbia Liberal Party, he was first elected in 2001 and re-elected in 2005, 2009, 2013 and  2017.  In the election of 2017, he became the oldest person to be elected in the history of B.C. politics at age 83.

Sultan has served as Minister of State for Seniors (2012–13), Minister Responsible for Multiculturalism (2013), and Minister of Advanced Education, Innovation and Technology (2013). He was previously a member of the Select Standing Committee on Public Accounts. He decided to retire rather than run in the 2020 British Columbia general election.

Electoral record

References

External links
 Official Biography, Legislative Assembly of British Columbia

1933 births
British Columbia Liberal Party MLAs
Canadian Lutherans
Living people
Members of the Executive Council of British Columbia
Politicians from Vancouver
21st-century Canadian politicians